"Did You Ever Think" is a single by American musician R. Kelly, on his third solo studio album titled R. It was the seventh single on that album and charted at the top 40 on the Billboard Hot 100, at number 27. The remix features rapper Nas and a video has been made for the remix, but not the original. It charted at number eight on the R&B/Hip Hop chart and at number 20 on the UK Singles Chart.

Music video
The music video is directed by R. Kelly and Bille Woodruff. The video is for the remix and it features rapper Nas.

Charts

Weekly charts

Year-end charts

Later samples
"How to Rob" by 50 Cent featuring The Madd Rapper from the album Power of the Dollar and In Too Deep (soundtrack)
"Streets Love Me" by Foxy Brown from the album Ill Na Na 2: The Fever
"The Quan" by Foxy Brown from the album Brooklyn's Don Diva
"Perdono" by Tiziano Ferro from the album Rosso Relativo

Covers
Palestinian rap group DAM covered "Did You Ever Think".

References

1998 songs
1999 singles
R. Kelly songs
Nas songs
Songs written by R. Kelly
Songs written by Jean-Claude Olivier
Songs written by Samuel Barnes (songwriter)
Songs written by Curtis Mayfield
Song recordings produced by R. Kelly
Song recordings produced by Trackmasters
Jive Records singles
Music videos directed by Bille Woodruff